Rashit Mustafa (August 18, 1955 – March 24, 1999) was an Albanian commander of the Kosovo Liberation Army (KLA), he is best known for leading the Special Unit "Skanderbeg'' (Garda profesionale "Skenderbeu'' in Albanian) of the 138th Brigade of the KLA. During the war, he had the nickname "Komandant Karadaku" (Commander Karadak in English).

Biography 
Mustafa was born in the village of Lubishtë, in the Karadak Highlands of Vitina. 

During the Croatian War of Independence, he joined the HVO in their fight against the Yugoslav forces. He would stay in Croatia until the End of the War. 3 years later he would join the FARK forces, which were fighting for Kosovar Independence.

Due to his experience as a soldier in Croatia, he proved to be an excellent fighter during the Kosovo war, this led to him being appointed as the Leader of the Special Unit "Skanderbeg'' (Garda profesionale "Skenderbeu'' in Albanian) of the 138th Brigade "Agim Ramadani" of the KLA. With his Unit he participated in many Attacks and battes along the Yugoslav-Albanian Border, most notably the Battle of Koshare.

Death 
On 01.06.1999, 11 days before the end of the Kosovo war, he still had in contact with his family, before disappearing for six years. He is believed to be the victim of a political murder of the LDK-PDK rivalry

On 28.06.2005, his body was discovered by civilians in Gjakova.

References 

1999 deaths
Kosovo Liberation Army soldiers